Jasc or JASC may refer to:

Japan America Student Conference
Jasc Software
 Joint Aircraft System/Component JASC Code. FAA and Joint Aviation Authority(European Civil Aviation Conference) code table for printed and electronic manuals. See ATA 100
 Jewish Agricultural Settlement Corporation (JASC), the American branch of the German settlement organization Juedische Landarbeit GmbH